The 1973–74 Romanian Hockey League season was the 44th season of the Romanian Hockey League. Eight teams participated in the league, and Steaua Bucuresti won the championship.

First round

Final round

5th-8th place

External links
hochei.net

Rom
Romanian Hockey League seasons
Rom